Southeast Village is a neighborhood located in Southeast Sacramento.  Its boundaries are Lemon Hill Ave to the north, 65th St. Expy to the west, 53rd Ave to the south, along with Logan St and 75th St to the east.

Features 
Elder Creek Road is the main artery that runs through the middle of the neighborhood.  The neighborhood has one elementary school, one park, one cemetery, one apartment complex, one shopping complex, and five places of worship, along with a creek.  The area is primarily residential, yet very close is an industrial area, and is bordered by the Sacramento County in the south.

Camellia Basic is a magnet school.

Camellia Park is adjacent to the school.  It has a lighted tennis court, small soccer field, baseball diamond, adventure play area, and basketball courts for physical activity.  It is being expanded.

Elder Creek Cemetery is a small plot dating back to 1864 and is considered a historic cemetery.

Morrison Creek is a creek that splits the neighborhood from the northern section and the Southern Portion.

Kennedy Estates is located on the very western edge of the neighborhood. The apartment complex provides an affordable place to live.

Elder Creek Market is the only shopping complex located within the neighborhood.  It provides goods that otherwise people would have to travel further to buy.

Government 

 Sacramento City Council: Sacramento City District 6
 Sacramento County Board of Supervisors: Sacramento County District 1
 California State Legislature: 9th Assembly District; 6th Senate District
 United States House of Representatives:

References 

Neighborhoods in Sacramento, California